C. poeppigii may refer to:

 Campylocentrum poeppigii, a rare orchid
 Canna poeppigii, a garden plant
 Carex poeppigii, a true sedge
 Citharexylum poeppigii, a flowering plant
 Cyathea poeppigii, a tree fern
 Cyathus poeppigii, a bird's nest fungus
 Cyperus poeppigii, a papyrus sedge